Mohamed Sharif (born 1 July 1988) is a Somalian former footballer who is last known to have played as a goalkeeper for Schelluinen.

Career

While playing for a Somali community team in the Netherlands, Sharif was called up to represent Somalia internationally.

References

External links
 

Association football goalkeepers
Living people
Somalian footballers
Somalia international footballers
1988 births